Jón Þór Hauksson (born 2 May 1978) is an Icelandic football coach and former player. He was the manager of the Icelandic women's national team from 2018 to 2020. He is currently the manager of Úrvaldsdeildar club ÍA

Managing career
Jón Þór started his coaching career as an assistant manager for ÍA. He served as the team's manager for six games in 2017 after the firing of manager Gunnlaugur Jónsson. After the season he was hired as an assistant manager of Stjarnan men's team where he won the Icelandic Cup in 2018.

In October 2018, Jón Þór was introduced as the new manager of the Icelandic women's national team. In December 2020, he guided the team to a berth at the UEFA Women's Euro 2022 after the team defeated Hungary 1–0. On 8 December 2020, the Football Association of Iceland announced that Jón Þór would step down as the manager of the national team, following remarks he made towards certain players in front of the whole team, while under the influence of alcohol, during its celebration of the victory against Hungary. In a statement released by Jón Þór, he acknowledged that he had crossed the line with his remarks as the celebration was neither the place nor time to make them and certainly not while under the influence of alcohol.

In July 2021, he was hired as the head coach of 1. deild karla club Vestri, replacing Heiðar Birnir Torleifsson who had resigned days earlier.

References

External links

1978 births
Living people
Jón Þór Hauksson
Association football midfielders
Jón Þór Hauksson
Jón Þór Hauksson
Jón Þór Hauksson